Ridgeview High School is a public high school located in Redmond, Oregon, United States. Opened in 2012, it is the second high school in the Redmond School District. In athletics the school is a 5A team in the Oregon School Activities Association, competing primarily in the Intermountain Conference with rival Redmond High School.

History
Voters in the school district approved a $110-million bond measure in 2008 to pay for a new high school and other construction. Construction began in 2011 and the school opened in fall 2012. The school took the name Ridgeview in February 2011.

Building
The  school cost $75 million to build. The two-story structure was designed by Dull Olson Weekes Architects, and built by Skanska USA. The school sits on  along the Old Bend-Redmond Highway and is designed to handle about 1,400 students. The school's gymnasium can seat approximately 2,000 people, while the auditorium can handle over 600. In addition to the main gymnasium, there is a separate wrestling room. The auditorium includes trap doors on the stage as well as a full-size orchestra pit.

Overall, the building was designed to Leadership in Energy and Environmental Design (LEED) Gold standards, with sustainable features such as solar panels. Other features of the building include a kitchen for students in the culinary arts program, a media studio complete with green screen, flexible classroom spaces, medical classrooms, and lab space for jewelry-making.

Athletics
The school fields teams in cross country, football, soccer, volleyball, basketball, swimming, wrestling, golf, baseball, softball, tennis, and track and field. The school is in the 5A classification of the Oregon School Activities Association and competes in the Intermountain Conference. Known as the Ravens, the school colors are purple, black and silver. The school's 1,400-seat football stadium is located on campus and has an eight-lane track encircling the field. The Ravens varsity football team won the 2013 OSAA 4A state title in only its second year as a public school. There are also two softball and two baseball diamonds, along with a weight room, wrestling room, gymnasium, and eight tennis courts.

References

External links
Sneak peek into Ridgeview High School

High schools in Deschutes County, Oregon
Buildings and structures in Redmond, Oregon
Public high schools in Oregon
Educational institutions established in 2012
2012 establishments in Oregon